St. Thomas's Church in Kolkata, India, is a Roman Catholic, Latin Rite church. It is one of the colonial style buildings of the city. It is located in Middleton Row, Park Street. Mother Teresa lay in state in this church for one week prior to her funeral, in September 1997.

History
On 11 September 1841, Mgr. Carew laid the foundation stone of St. Thomas’ Church. It was Blessed on 5 May 1842, Ascension day and officially opened to the public on 8 September 1842. It is the second parish established by Mgr. Carew in the City of Kolkata in 1844.

References

Roman Catholic churches in Kolkata
Roman Catholic churches in West Bengal